A referendum on banning the privatisation of strategically important state-owned companies was held in Slovakia on 25 and 26 September 1998. Although approved by 84.3% of those voting, voter turnout was just 44.1% and the referendum was declared invalid due to insufficient turnout.

Results

References

1998 referendums
Referendums in Slovakia
1998 in Slovakia
Privatisation referendums
Privatization in Slovakia
September 1998 events in Europe